The little Danes experiment, also known simply as "the experiment", was a 1951 Danish operation where 22 Greenlandic Inuit children ("experiment children") were sent to Danish foster families in an attempt to re-educate them as "little Danes". While the children were all supposed to be orphans, most were not. Six children were adopted while in Denmark, and sixteen returned to Greenland, only to be placed in Danish-speaking orphanages and never live with their families again. Half of the children experienced mental health disturbances, and half of them died in young adulthood. The government of Denmark officially apologised in 2020, after several years of demands from Greenlandic officials.

Background 
Following World War II, Danish government officials and non-governmental organisations believed Greenlandic society was underdeveloped, and sought to redesign it. Together with the Red Cross and Save the Children, they manufactured an experiment to create a system where Greenlandic children would be brought to the Danish mainland, learn Danish, be fostered by Danish families, and then come back to Greenland as "little Danes": A population that was to become, according to the colonial studies researcher Claire Louise McLisky, the "new ruling class of Greenlanders". The children were supposed to be selected by Greenlandic priests according to certain criteria: Around six years old, without mental or physical impairments, and orphaned.

Experiment 

Even though the participants selected were supposed to all be parentless and about six years old, priests could not find enough qualifying children. As a result, only six were orphans, and one child was nine years old when the experiment began. With the selections made, the MS Disko departed Nuuk in May 1951 carrying 22 Greenlandic Inuit children: thirteen boys and nine girls. They soon arrived in Copenhagen, Denmark—a country Helene Thiesen, one of the children, "had never previously heard of". After being moved to a so-called holiday camp at Fedgaarden, operated by Save the Children, they were immediately placed in quarantine over fears they carried contagious diseases. This quarantine lasted the whole of the summer; there, Thiesen broke out with eczema. The queen of Denmark, Ingrid, visited the camp and took pictures with the children. Thiesen said she "didn't understand a thing" of the queen's visit, and that her general unease of the experiment showed through in the photo, in which "none of us is smiling".

The children were then placed in Danish foster families for over a year. There, they learned the Danish language and forgot Kalaallisut. They were supposed to be sent back to Nuuk after about six months, but the construction of the orphanage by the program stalled, and over the course of their yearlong stay in Denmark, six of them were adopted by Danish families.

Aftermath and apology 
Sixteen children returned to Greenland, while six were adopted by Danish families. Those who returned to Greenland were "top class" according to archival documents. None of them were to ever live with their families again, and even if they could, they could no longer speak the same language. They were placed into the orphanage, only permitted (alongside their Greenlandic Inuit staff) to speak Danish; this policy was to distill the "benefits" of Danish living to the children. By 1960, all of the children had vacated their orphanage, and sixteen of the 22 children lived outside of Greenland for most of their lives. About half of the children experienced mental health disturbances, substance abuse, and suicide attempts over the course of their lives, and half of the children died in young adulthood. They experienced extensive cultural isolation and social alienation, and Thiesen said they "lost their sense of purpose in life". Modified forms of the experiment were held in the 1960s and 1970s, where children would go to Denmark only for a short while, and then be returned to their families; these experiments also negatively impacted the children.

In 1996, a Danish archivist told Thiesen for the first time that she was a participant in an experiment, and in 1998, the Danish Red Cross shared its "regret" for it. In 2009, the prime minister of Greenland, Kuupik Kleist, demanded an apology from the Danish government, saying the experiment is a "classic colonial case". The same demand was also made by the Social Democrats of Denmark, calling it a "black chapter" for the nation, alongside requests for an investigating commission of the experiment. Despite these calls, no apology was made by Lars Løkke Rasmussen, the prime minister of Denmark, who said instead: "History cannot be changed. The government regards the colonial period as a closed part of our shared history. We must be pleased with the fact that times have changed." Conversely, Save the Children apologised for the experiment, while also saying that they may have intentionally destroyed their documents relating to it; they apologised again in 2015, with the general secretary saying they "will never enter into a cooperation of this nature with the authorities". Just as Rasmussen refused to apologise, so too did following prime ministers of Denmark, and Helle Thorning-Schmidt declined to participate in an investigation. In 2019, two Greenlandic members of the Folketing made demands: Aaja Chemnitz Larsen (Inuit Ataqatigiit) demanded that an apology be made, and Ineqi Kielsen (Siumut) demanded that an investigating commission be made. As a result of Kielsen's request, Rasmussen agreed with Greenlandic prime minister Kim Kielsen to create a commission, though he again refused to make an apology. 

The next year, after waiting for the commission's report, the government of Denmark and its prime minister, Mette Frederiksen, officially apologised for the little Danes experiment. There were only six surviving members of the experiment, among them Helene Thiesen, then 76 years old, who had been a proponent of officially recognising it. In December 2021, the survivors sued for 250,000 kroner (USD$38,000) in compensation from Denmark for "violation of current Danish law and human rights"; Astrid Krag, the Danish minister for social affairs, said the government was "in dialogue" with their lawyers, though she stressed the most important aspect for Denmark "has been an official apology". In March 2022, the government announced that the six surviving experiment members will receive a face-to-face apology from the prime minister and their requested compensation of 250,000 kroner; Frederiksen traveled to Nuuk to apologise in a speech.

See also 
 Godhavn inquiry – Report on child abuse and mistreatment in Danish children's homes between 1945 and 1976; in 2019, the government apologised in this case as well
 Legally fatherless – Danish laws regarding the legal paternity of the children of unwed Greenlandic women
 Spiral case – Investigation into 1960s and 1970s Greenlandic birth control program

Notes and references

Notes

Citations

Bibliography

 
 
 
 
 
 
 
 
 
 
 
 
 

 
 

1951 in Denmark
1951 in Greenland
Child welfare
Denmark–Greenland relations
Displacement of indigenous children
History of Nuuk
Human subject research
Inuit history
Orphanages
Social science experiments